Rye (Secale cereale) is a grass grown extensively as a grain, a cover crop and a forage crop. It is a member of the tribe Triticeae and is closely related to both wheat (Triticum) and barley (genus Hordeum). Rye grain is used for flour, bread, beer, crispbread, some whiskeys, some vodkas, and animal fodder. It can also be eaten whole, either as boiled rye berries or by being rolled, similar to rolled oats.

Rye is a cereal grain and should not be confused with ryegrass, which is used for lawns, pasture, and as hay for livestock.

Distribution and habitat 

Rye is one of a number of species that grow wild in the Levant, central and eastern Turkey and in adjacent areas. Evidence uncovered at the Epipalaeolithic site of Tell Abu Hureyra in the Euphrates valley of northern Syria suggests that rye was among the first cereal crops to be systematically cultivated, around 13,000 years ago. However, that claim remains controversial; critics point to inconsistencies in the radiocarbon dates, and identifications based solely on grain, rather than on chaff.

Domesticated rye occurs in small quantities at a number of Neolithic sites in Asia Minor (Anatolia, now Turkey), such as the Pre-Pottery Neolithic B Can Hasan III near Çatalhöyük, but is otherwise absent from the archaeological record until the Bronze Age of central Europe, c. 1800–1500 BCE. It is possible that rye traveled west from Asia Minor as a minor admixture in wheat (possibly as a result of Vavilovian mimicry), and was only later cultivated in its own right. Archeological evidence of this grain has been found in Roman contexts along the Rhine and the Danube and in Ireland and Britain. Roman naturalist Pliny the Elder was dismissive of a grain that may have been rye, writing that it "is a very poor food and only serves to avert starvation". He said it was mixed with spelt "to mitigate its bitter taste, and even then is most unpleasant to the stomach".

Winter rye is any breed of rye planted in the autumn to provide ground cover for the winter. It grows during warmer days of the winter when sunlight temporarily warms the plant above freezing, even while there is general snow cover. It can be used to prevent the growth of winter-hardy weeds, and can either be harvested as a bonus crop or tilled directly into the ground in spring to provide more organic matter for the next summer's crop. It is sometimes used in winter gardens and is a common nurse crop.

Rye grows better than any other cereal in heavy clay and light sandy and infertile or drought-affected soils. It can tolerate pH between 4.5 and 8.0, but soils having pH 5.0 to 7.0 are best suited for rye cultivation. Rye grows best in fertile, well-drained loam or clay-loam soils.

Frost resistance 
S. cereale can thrive in subzero environments. The leaves of winter rye produce various antifreeze polypeptides (different from the antifreeze polypeptides produced by some fish and insects).

Ecology 
The nematode Ditylenchus dipsaci, leaf beetle, fruit fly, gout fly, cereal chafer, dart moth, cereal bug, Hessian fly, and rustic shoulder knot are among insects which can seriously affect rye health.

Diseases 

Rye is highly susceptible to the ergot fungus. Consumption of ergot-infected rye by humans and animals results in a serious medical condition known as ergotism. Ergotism can cause both physical and mental harm, including convulsions, miscarriage, necrosis of digits, hallucinations and death. Historically, damp northern countries that have depended on rye as a staple crop were subject to periodic epidemics of this condition. Such epidemics have been found to correlate with periods of frequent witch trials, such as the Salem witch trials in Massachusetts in 1692. Modern grain-cleaning and milling methods have practically eliminated the disease, but contaminated flour may end up in bread and other food products if the ergot is not removed before milling.

After an absence of 60 years, stem rust (Puccinia graminis f. sp. tritici) has returned to Europe. Areas affected include Germany, Russia (Western Siberia), Spain, and Sweden. Races PTGBH, PTGFH, RKBBK, SKGBC, SKGBH, SKGBR, TKDLK, TKGBK, TKGBR, and TKGDH are now present on rye in Spain.

Invasiveness 
Rye is a common, unwanted invader of winter wheat fields. If allowed to grow and mature, it may cause substantially reduced prices (docking) for harvested wheat.

Cultivation 

Since the Middle Ages, people have cultivated rye widely in Central and Eastern Europe. It serves as the main bread cereal in most areas east of the France–Germany border and north of Hungary. In Southern Europe, it was cultivated on marginal lands.

Rye grows well in much poorer soils than those necessary for most cereal grains. Thus, it is an especially valuable crop in regions where the soil has sand or peat. Rye plants withstand cold better than other small grains do. Rye will survive with snow cover that would otherwise result in winter-kill for winter wheat. Most farmers grow winter ryes, which are planted and begin to grow in autumn. In spring, the plants develop and produce their crop.

Vigorous growth suppresses even the most noxious weed competitors and rye can be grown without application of herbicides.

Physical properties of rye affect attributes of the final food product such as seed size and surface area, and porosity. The surface area of the seed directly correlates to the drying and heat transfer time. Smaller seeds have increased heat transfer, which leads to lower drying time. Seeds with lower amounts of porosity also have lower tendencies to lose water during the process of drying.

Diversity and uses 

Along with S. cereale's relationship and impact on the environment, it is also a valuable species because of its expansive diversity and uses. In northern Portugal, fourteen different populations of S. cereale were analyzed in order to better understand their differences. It was discovered that the storage proteins are very diverse and possess a lot of overall genetic variation as well, which is useful information to know because scientists can use its diversity in breeding to produce the most efficient cultivar of S. cereale. Moreover, the beneficial characteristics of S. cereale can also be used to improve certain characteristics of other useful plants, like wheat. The pollination abilities of wheat were vastly improved when there was cross-pollination with S. cereale. The addition of the rye chromosome 4R increased the size of the wheat anther along with increasing the number of pollen grains present. 

Along with improved wheat, the optimal characteristics of S. cereale can also be combined with another perennial rye, specifically S. montanum Guss, in order to produce S. cereanum, which has the beneficial characteristics of each. The hybrid rye (S. cereanum) can be grown in all environments, even with less than favorable soil and protects some soils from erosion. In addition, the plant mixture has improved forage and is known to contain digestible fiber and protein. Information about the diversity, the genome and S. cereanum's ability to cross fertilize with other species is useful information for scientists to know as they attempt to come up with various plant species that will be able to feed humanity in the future without leaving a negative footprint on the environment.

The  chromosome is the source of many crop disease resistance genes.  is a variety which has donated 1R-originating resistance to wheat, as have several other varieties including Insave, Amigo, and Imperial.

Harvesting 
The harvesting of rye is similar to that of wheat. It is usually done with combine harvesters, which cut the plants, thresh and winnow the grain, and release the straw to the field where it is later pressed into bales or left as soil amendment. The resultant grain is stored in local silos or transported to regional grain elevators and combined with other lots for storage and distant shipment. Before the era of mechanised agriculture, rye harvesting was a manual task performed with scythes or sickles. The cut rye was often shocked for drying or storage, and the threshing was done by manually beating the seed heads against a floor or other object.

Production and consumption statistics 

Rye is grown primarily in Eastern, Central and Northern Europe. The main rye belt stretches from northern Germany through Poland, Ukraine, Belarus, Lithuania and Latvia into central and northern Russia. Rye is also grown in North America (Canada and the United States), in South America (Argentina, Brazil and Chile), in Oceania (Australia and New Zealand), in Turkey, in Kazakhstan and in northern China.

Production levels of rye have fallen since 1992 in most of the producing nations, .

World trade of rye is low compared with other grains such as wheat. The total export of rye for 2016 was $186M compared with $30.1B for wheat.

Nordic and Baltic countries are also very high.

Uses 

Rye grain is refined into a flour high in gliadin but low in glutenin. It therefore has a lower gluten content than wheat flour. It also contains a higher proportion of soluble fiber. Alkylresorcinols are phenolic lipids present in high amounts in the bran layer (e.g. pericarp, testa and aleurone layers) of wheat and rye (0.1–0.3% of dry weight). Rye bread, including pumpernickel, is made using rye flour and is a widely eaten food in Northern and Eastern Europe. Rye is also used to make crisp bread.

Rye grain is used to make alcoholic drinks, such as rye whiskey and rye beer. Other uses of rye grain include kvass and an herbal medicine known as rye extract. Rye straw is used as livestock bedding, as a cover crop and green manure for soil amendment, and to make crafts such as corn dollies.

Rye flour is used in the original way to make Falun red paint (in addition to linseed oil and iron oxide) in Sweden.

Rye grain (aka "Rye Berries") is a popular medium to use as a grain spawn when cultivating some varieties of edible mushrooms. The grain is cleaned, hydrated, and sterilized and then injected with mushroom spores and the mycelium grow using the grain to obtain water and nutrients.

Food

Nutrition 

A  reference serving of rye provides  of food energy and is a rich source (20% or more of the Daily Value [DV]) of essential nutrients, including protein, dietary fiber, the B vitamins, niacin (27% DV) and vitamin B6 (23% DV), and several dietary minerals (table). Highest nutrient contents are for manganese (143% DV) and phosphorus (47% DV).

Health effects 

Eating whole-grain rye, as well as other high-fibre grains, improves regulation of blood sugar (i.e., reduces blood glucose response to a meal). Consuming breakfast cereals containing rye over weeks to months also improved cholesterol levels and glucose regulation.

Health concerns 

Like wheat, barley, and their hybrids and derivatives, rye contains gluten, which makes it an unsuitable grain for consumption by people with gluten-related disorders, such as celiac disease, non-celiac gluten sensitivity, and wheat allergy, among others. Nevertheless, some wheat allergy patients can tolerate rye or barley.

Ergotism is an illness that can result from eating rye and other grains infected by ergot fungi (which produce ergoline toxins in infected products). Although it is no longer a common illness because of modern food safety efforts, it was common before the 20th century, and it can still happen today if food safety vigilance breaks down.

Hybridization 
Rye has long been considered an inferior grain to wheat in quality and digestibility, but has far larger kernels and is more hardy. In the 19th century, efforts were made to create a hybrid with the best qualities of both, known initially as triticosecale, but eventually becoming known as triticale. Initially fraught with fertility and germination problems, triticale is becoming more common worldwide in the 21st century, with millions of acres being produced.

Gallery

References

Further reading 

 Schlegel provides a 2011 updated version online.

External links 
 
 

 
Cereals
Plants described in 1753
Pooideae
Staple foods